Electric Eye is a compilation DVD by Judas Priest released in 2003 and certified Platinum by the RIAA. It features music videos, BBC performances, and the first official DVD release of a concert filmed in Dallas, Texas during the 1986 Fuel for Life Tour, previously released as Priest...Live! on VHS and LaserDisc.

Track listing

Music Videos
 "Living After Midnight" (1980) – 3:33 
 "Breaking the Law" (1980) – 2:40 
 "Don't Go" (1981) – 3:20
 "Heading Out to the Highway" (1981) – 3:48
 "Hot Rockin'" (1981) – 3:07
 "You've Got Another Thing Comin'" (1982) – 4:23 
 "Freewheel Burning" (1984) – 4:37
 "Love Bites" (1984) – 4:04
 "Locked In" (1986) – 4:02
 "Turbo Lover" (1986) – 4:39
 "Johnny B. Goode" (1988) – 4:29
 "Painkiller" (1990) – 6:11 
 "A Touch of Evil" (1990) – 4:37

Live – Dallas, Texas 1986
 "Out in the Cold" – 5:15 
 "Locked In" – 4:56
 "Heading Out to the Highway" – 4:42
 "Breaking the Law" – 2:30
 "Love Bites" – 5:42
 "Some Heads Are Gonna Roll" – 4:50
 "The Sentinel" – 5:18
 "Private Property" – 4:55
 "Desert Plains" – 4:46
 "Rock You All Around the World" – 4:51
 "The Hellion/Electric Eye" – 4:15
 "Turbo Lover" – 6:09
 "Freewheel Burning" – 4:35
 "The Green Manalishi (With the Two Prong Crown)" – 5:10
 "Parental Guidance" – 4:51
 "Living After Midnight" – 5:50
 "You've Got Another Thing Comin'" – 8:24 
Encores:
 "Hell Bent for Leather" – 4:07
 "Metal Gods" (Incomplete. Song plays over end credits and fades out mid song.)

BBC Performances
 "Rocka Rolla" – Old Grey Whistle Test 25/4/75 – 3:15
 "Dreamer Deceiver" – Old Grey Whistle Test 25/4/75 – 6:29
 "Take On the World" – Top of the Pops 25/01/79 – 2:26
 "Evening Star" – Top of the Pops 17/5/79 – 2:39
 "Living After Midnight" – Top of The Pops 27/3/80 – 3:16
 "United" – Top of the Pops 28/8/80 – 3:09

Personnel
Rob Halford – lead vocals, harmonica
K.K. Downing – guitar, backing vocals
Glenn Tipton – guitar, backing vocals
Ian Hill – bass
Scott Travis – drums

Former drummers featured
John Hinch
Les Binks 
Dave Holland

Certifications

|-

References

Judas Priest video albums
2003 video albums
Live video albums
Music video compilation albums
2003 live albums
2003 compilation albums